On May 12, 2022, a severe squall line followed by a derecho took place across the Midwestern United States. Two fatalities occurred from the first line of storms while three more deaths occurred from the derecho itself.

Meteorological synopsis

In the leadup to the derecho, temperatures were very warm. Temperatures in the 90s helped fuel the severe weather that later erupted over the Great Plains. On May 10, 2022, the Storm Prediction Center noted the elevated probabilities for severe weather to materialize, as atmospheric conditions over western Minnesota, northwestern Iowa, northeastern Nebraska, eastern South Dakota, and southeastern North Dakota were favorable for thunderstorms to develop. The development of a mid-level shortwave trough in this area, combined with the arrival of a cold front over a low-pressure area in the vicinity of the Dakotas, prompted the issuance of a Day 3 enhanced risk over the area, with a large 30% hatched area (indicating a ≥10% chance of significant severe weather) for severe weather to develop. The next day, the SPC maintained the enhanced risk for the same general areas of the upper Great Plains, but introduced a large 30% area for damaging winds, alongside a smaller 45% corridor for destructive winds over southwestern Minnesota, eastern South Dakota, and extreme northwestern Iowa. A 10%, unhatched area for tornadoes (indicating a <10% chance of EF2 or stronger tornadoes) was also included in the outlook, placed over northeastern South Dakota, southeastern North Dakota, and west-central Minnesota. While the outlook favored a more linear mode composed of a long squall line, the possibilities for individual supercell thunderstorms was also discussed.

As the day of the event arrived, the SPC maintained the enhanced risk for the same general areas as the overall expected scenario, but part of the 45% wind risk area was hatched at the 1300 UTC outlook, requiring the issuance of a moderate risk in its 1300 UTC outlook centered in west-central Minnesota, eastern South Dakota, and extreme southeastern North Dakota. At 1525 UTC, the SPC issued a PDS Severe Thunderstorm Watch for a prolific wind event with hazards of winds expected of 105 MPH. By 1630 UTC, the SPC slightly expanded the moderate risk area to encompass more area of east-central South Dakota. The outlook also introduced a small 10% hatched corridor for tornadoes, noting the possibilities for a few strong tornadoes to occur ahead of the main line. 3500-4500 J/kg CAPE values placed themselves over the are of concern, alongside 300-500 m2/s2 helicity and 45-55-kt wind shear, hence the increase for tornado potential. However, the main risk continued to be severe wind.

As the evening advanced, the forecasted severe line of thunderstorms developed in the central Great Plains, eventually advancing towards the greatest area of concern. Multiple reports of fatalities were received, as the damaging winds claimed at least three lives throughout the Plains. At least three people were killed by the storms. While the event was primarily dominated by the severe derecho that developed, multiple tornadoes were also reported, mainly in South Dakota and Minnesota. A brief but high-end EF2 tornado caused severe damage in the town of Gary, South Dakota, while a long-tracked EF2 tornado impacted Wadena County, Minnesota, causing damage to vehicles and barns along its track.

Impact

The derecho affected portions of northeastern Iowa, Minnesota, Nebraska, southeastern North Dakota, and South Dakota. Its strong winds lofted and accumulated a thick cloud of dust, resulting in a haboob that accompanied the derecho. South Dakota governor Kristi Noem reported that 28 counties in the state sustained damage, with the severity of the effects leading to a declaration of a state of emergency. A wind gust of 107 MPH was measured near Tripp, South Dakota. At least three people were killed by the storms. Two people in Minnehaha County, including one in Sioux Falls, were killed by flying debris from the storm. Another person was killed in Kandiyohi County, Minnesota, after a grain bin was thrown onto a vehicle by strong winds. Severe weather suspended a baseball game between the Minneapolis Twins and Houston Astros. With 68 hurricane-force wind gusts, this broke the record from December 15, 2021 for the most hurricane-force wind gusts in a derecho. Portions of Interstate 29 and Interstate 90 closed.

Confirmed tornadoes

May 12 event

See also
 List of North American tornadoes and tornado outbreaks
 Weather of 2022
 List of derecho events

References

2022 meteorology
Derechos in the United States
F2 tornadoes
Tornadoes of 2022
2022 natural disasters in the United States
May 2022 events in the United States